Ularbek Baitailaq (Ūlarbek Baitailaq) is a Kazakh archivist and journalist. He is an employee of the Kazakh National Archive, and has contributed articles to the opposition papers DAT and Altyn Tamyr. In early August 2012 he was assaulted by four assailants and hospitalized.

References

Kazakhstani journalists
Living people
People from Almaty
Archivists
Year of birth missing (living people)